The 1995 Hungarian Grand Prix (formally the XI Marlboro Magyar Nagydij) was a Formula One motor race held on 13 August 1995 at the Hungaroring, Mogyoród, Pest, Hungary. It was the tenth race of the 1995 Formula One World Championship.

The 77-lap race was won by Damon Hill, driving a Williams-Renault. Hill took his third victory of the season after starting from pole position, leading all 77 laps and setting the fastest race lap. Teammate David Coulthard finished second, with Gerhard Berger third in a Ferrari.

The Jordan team were waiting on the pitwall for Rubens Barrichello to claim 3rd place, however his engine died on the last corner, and he crawled to the line in 7th.

Pedro Lamy replaced Pierluigi Martini at Minardi.

Taki Inoue was hit by a safety car Tatra 623 as he attempted to extinguish a fire on his Footwork, this was his second incident with a safety car in this season. He suffered minor injuries.

Classification

Qualifying

Race

Championship standings after the race 

Drivers' Championship standings

Constructors' Championship standings

References 

Hungarian Grand Prix
Hungarian Grand Prix
Hungarian Grand Prix
Hungarian Grand Prix